New In Town was a life-simulation social network game developed by Digital Chocolate that "allows players to customize an avatar and take another shot at life after high school, choosing a career and establishing themselves in a fictional city." The game's genre is similar to popular The Sims series but with a time mechanics based gameplay that is more reminiscent of legacy titles such as Jones in the Fast Lane.

Gameplay 
The player's goal is to "find a life, love and gainful employment in the big city". The gameplay is based on time mechanics: everything the player's character—their avatar—does costs a certain number of time units to complete. This includes moving around the city, purchasing items, hanging out with friends or working. When the player runs out of time units, the current game day is over and the avatar must sleep.

If the avatar’s happiness level is too low or hungry, a penalty to the time units available for the next day is levied. Happiness can be restored by eating food (which only has to be done once per day in order to stave off the hunger penalty), shopping, socializing with friends or attending fun activities such as going to the movies. Happiness drops while working or studying, though both are necessary: working provides the player with money, while studying increases skill levels, certain levels of which are necessary to secure higher-paying jobs.

References

External links 
 Official web site

2012 video games
Browser-based multiplayer online games
Inactive multiplayer online games
Digital Chocolate games
Facebook games
Life simulation games
Social casual games
Video games developed in the United States